Joshua Marques Pereira da Silva (born 21 August 1990) is a Portuguese professional footballer who plays as a centre back for S.C. Olhanense.

Club career
Born in Johannesburg, South Africa to Portuguese parents, Silva was a young Portuguese football talent with a lot of expectations for signing his first professional contract with 1st division S.C Olhanense at 17 years old. The first four years as a senior in the Portuguese 3rd and Second league, representing CDR Quarteirense, S.C. Farense, Estrela de Vendas Novas and S.C.U. Torreense all on loan from Portuguese 1st Division team S.C Olhanense. 
He was then called up for Portuguese National under 21 team in which they had a victory over Ireland and a draw against Denmark. In January 2013 he signed with 2nd Division Greek club Anagennisi Epanomi FC on a settled transfer fee, making his professional debut on the 27th by playing the full 90 minutes in a 2–0 away loss against Iraklis Thessaloniki F.C. for the second level championship.

In the summer of 2014, after joining one season with former Second division (Championship) side Farense, Silva was linked to 1st Division Portuguese team Braga but completed a move abroad again, joining 1st Division team Zawisza Bydgoszcz. Here he won his first trophy, the Polish Supercup, and made his debut in the Europa league the same season against Zulte from Belgium.

Ahead of the 2015 season in Norway, Silva joined the Norwegian Premiership team Bodø/Glimt. Silva failed his medical examination when joining Bodø/Glimt and was sent back to Spain. But Bodø/Glimt changed their mind and signed him anyway before the transfer window closed. Silva needed time to reach match fitness and didn't get his opportunity. His only obligatory game for Bodø/Glimt was as a substitute in the 2nd round match against Mjølner in the Norwegian Cup. In August 2015 Silva and Bodø/Glimt agreed to terminate his contract so he could join Viktoria 1889 Berlin.

In July 2021 he signed with Lithuanian club DFK Dainava. He made his debut in A Lyga on 19 July 2021 against FK Riteriai and scored the first goal while Dainava won 2–1.

International career
Silva gained two caps for the Portuguese under-21 team, his first coming on 25 March 2011 as he played the first half of a 2–0 friendly win over the Republic of Ireland.

Personal life
Silva's younger brother, Matthew, is also a professional footballer.

Honours
Zawisza Bydgoszcz
Polish SuperCup: 2014

References

External links

National team data 
Portuguese League profile 

1990 births
Living people
Sportspeople from Johannesburg
Portuguese footballers
South African soccer players
Association football defenders
Liga Portugal 2 players
Segunda Divisão players
S.C. Olhanense players
S.C. Farense players
S.C.U. Torreense players
Anagennisi Karditsa F.C. players
Ekstraklasa players
Zawisza Bydgoszcz players
FK Bodø/Glimt players
FC Viktoria 1889 Berlin players
Berliner FC Dynamo players
Portugal under-21 international footballers
Portuguese expatriate footballers
Expatriate footballers in Greece
Expatriate footballers in Poland
Expatriate footballers in Norway
Expatriate footballers in Germany
Portuguese expatriate sportspeople in Germany
South African people of Portuguese descent
Citizens of Portugal through descent